Sena is an Icelandic company that specializes in event planning and promotion, movie distribution, entertainment and corporate events. It was founded in 2005 following Skífan's rebranding as Dagur Group as its distribution division.

References

External links
Sena official site
Sena Live official site

Companies based in Reykjavík
Icelandic brands
Privatised companies in Iceland
Record label distributors